Love the World (in some countries Perfume Global Compilation "Love the World") is the second compilation album by the Japanese trio Perfume. It was released on September 12, 2012 in Japan under their old label Tokuma Japan Communications, in two editions: CD+DVD and in a regular CD edition.

All its songs were produced by Yasutaka Nakata, and the album was released in Asia on October 15, 2012 and also worldwide. The digital release of the album was on September 12, 2012 via iTunes worldwide, except for Asia.

Background
The album was announced on the Perfume website on August 5, 2012. The physical version of the album is Perfume's first album to be released outside Japan, after having their first official global tour Perfume World Tour 1st that went to South Korea, Taiwan, Hong Kong and Singapore. The album was released in two editions: CD+DVD, the DVD including the music video of the song "Fake It", a making-of from the video and a special video of the song "Polyrhythm."

To promote the album, the music video of "Fake It" was released through Japan's music TV channels, such as MTV Japan, Music On! TV and Space Shower TV.

Composition
The album is composed of sixteen tracks, including singles, b-sides, album tracks and two new mixes. All songs were produced by Yasutaka Nakata.

The songs "Polyrhythm", "Baby Cruising Love", "Chocolate Disco", "Game", "Butterfly" and "Secret Secret" are from the band's first album Game. "Electro World" is from their first compilation album Perfume: Complete Best; "Dream Fighter", "Love the World", "Edge" and "Night Flight" are from their second album Triangle; "Laser Beam", "My Color" and "Glitter" are from their third album JPN; "Seventh Heaven" is the b-side of the single "Polyrhythm"; and "Fake It" the b-side of the single "Nee".

Track listing

Chart performance

Oricon

Other charts

Certifications

Release history

References

External links
 
 

2012 compilation albums
Japanese-language albums
Perfume (Japanese band) albums
Albums produced by Yasutaka Nakata